Hilt (also known as Hilts) is a Unincorporated community in Siskiyou County, California, United States. It is named for early settler John Hilt. Hilt was a company town for the Northern California Lumber Co. and the Fruit Growers Supply Co.

References

Unincorporated communities in California
Unincorporated communities in Siskiyou County, California